Simen Lillevik Kjellevold (born 7 November 1994) is a Norwegian football goalkeeper who currently plays for Strømmen.

Career
Hailing from Innvik, he started his youth career in Vikane IL and was promoted into the senior team (on the seventh tier) for the 2010 season. In 2012 he joined local spearheads Stryn TIL.

In 2016 he moved on to Førde IL, only to be snapped up by Stabæk Fotball in the summer of 2016. He pocketed a single league game for Førde. Bought as a future prospect, but at the moment being the third-choice goalkeeper, he was loaned out to Kongsvinger IL Toppfotball in the first half of 2017. He made his first-team debut for Stabæk in the 2018 Norwegian Football Cup and league debut in November 2018 following the injury of Marcus Sandberg.

References

1994 births
Living people
Norwegian footballers
Eliteserien players
Norwegian First Division players
Stabæk Fotball players
Kongsvinger IL Toppfotball players
Strømmen IF players
Association football goalkeepers
People from Stryn
Sportspeople from Vestland